Thornyhive Bay is an embayment along the North Sea coast in Aberdeenshire, Scotland. This bay is situated approximately 2.5 miles south of the town of Stonehaven and approximately 2.5 miles north of the Fowlsheugh Nature Reserve. The steep cliffs afford sightings of certain seabirds.

See also
 Dunnottar Castle
 Trelung Ness

References
 Gazetteer for Scotland: features, retrieved Aug. 2008
 C.Michael Hogan (2008) Looking across Thornyhive Bay, Geograph British Isles 
 Ordnance Survey (2004) Landranger  Map, Stonehaven and Banchory

Line notes

Bays of Aberdeenshire